Castroville may refer to:
 Castroville, California, United States
 Castroville, Texas, United States